Sir Arthur Hunter Palmer  (28 December 1819 – 20 March 1898) was an Irish-Australian politician who served as the fifth Premier of Queensland, in office from 1870 to 1874. He later held ministerial office in Thomas McIlwraith's ministry from 1879 to 1881, before serving as President of the Queensland Legislative Council from 1881 until his death in 1898.

Early life
Palmer was born in Armagh, Ireland, the son of Lieutenant Arthur Palmer, RN, and his wife, Emily ( Hunter). 

Palmer was educated at Youghal Grammar School and by a private tutor in Dublin. He emigrated to New South Wales in 1838, arriving in Sydney on the City of Edinburgh. Palmer worked for many years for Henry Cary Dangar on his New England stations, eventually becoming general manager of all Dangar's holdings. Palmer went to Queensland and took up pastoral runs in the Belyando River valley which he called Beaufort Station. He began acting as a magistrate in 1865.

Politics
In 1866, Palmer was elected to Parliament as member for Port Curtis in the Legislative Assembly of Queensland. On 2 August 1867 he became Colonial Secretary and Secretary for Public Works in the R. R. Mackenzie ministry, and in September 1868 Secretary for Public Lands. Mackenzie resigned on 25 November 1868 and Palmer went into opposition. On 3 May 1870 Palmer became Premier and Colonial Secretary, and in July 1873 Secretary for Public Works. Palmer's ministry was defeated on 6 January 1874. According to the Australian Dictionary of Biography, "Palmer cannot be said to have been instrumental in producing much legislation". However, his ministry was known for his cohesiveness, an atypical quality in the colonial period, and it survived two general elections. During an economic depression in 1870, Palmer authorised a civil-service retrenchment, which proved unpopular. Successful bills included the Electoral Redistribution Act, which divided the colony into single-member electoral districts based on population, and the Homestead Areas Act, which divided large pastoral leases into smaller areas of land.

Palmer was Colonial Secretary and Secretary for Public Instruction in the McIlwraith ministry which came into power in January 1879, but resigned these positions on 24 December 1881 to become President of the Queensland Legislative Council. Palmer remained in that position until his death.

Palmer served as Administrator (deputy to the Governor) from 2 May 1883 to 6 November 1883, from 20 April 1886 to 12 December 1886, from 9 October 1888 to 1 May 1889, and from 16 November 1890 to 6 May 1891. He also served as Lieutenant-Governor of Queensland from 15 November 1895 to 9 April 1896.

Later life
He died at Easton Gray, his home in Toowong, Queensland after a long illness and was buried in Toowong Cemetery.

Family

In 1865, Palmer married Miss Cecilia Jessie Mosman. Cecilia was the sister of Hugh Mosman who discovered gold in Charters Towers and of Harriette Mosman, the second wife of Queensland Premier Thomas McIlwraith. From 1872 to 1877, the Palmer family leased the house Fernberg in Paddington, which became Queensland's Government House in 1910. Cecilia died in 1885, and was survived by three sons and two daughters.

The family home, Easton Gray, was sold in 1944 for the construction of Toowong State High School, later Toowong College, and now the Queensland Academy for Science, Mathematics and Technology.

His grandson Beaufort Palmer was one of Australia's finest pilot instructors in World War II.

Honours
Palmer was awarded a KCMG in 1881.

See also
 Members of the Queensland Legislative Assembly, 1863–1867; 1867–1868; 1868–1870; 1870–1871; 1871–1873; 1873–1878; 1878–1883
 Members of the Queensland Legislative Council, 1880–1889; 1890–1899

References

Sources

1819 births
1898 deaths
Premiers of Queensland
Australian Knights Commander of the Order of St Michael and St George
Members of the Queensland Legislative Assembly
Members of the Queensland Legislative Council
Presidents of the Queensland Legislative Council
People from Armagh (city)
Burials at Toowong Cemetery
19th-century Australian politicians
Mosman family